Konstantinos 'Kostas' Kotsopoulos (born 21 February 1997) is a Greek professional footballer who plays as a forward for Super League club Atromitos.

Career

Atromitos
On 29 January 2018, he signed a three and a half years' contract with Super League club Atromitos. On 10 March 2018, he scored his first goal with the club in a 2–2 away draw against Panionios. On 31 October 2018, he scored a hat-trick as he scored with a head beyond the flailing goalkeeper. Two minutes after half time, Kotsopoulos then made it 2–0 for Atromitos, sliding a low cross over the line, and secured his hat trick to complete a resounding 6–1 away Greek Cup win against Iraklis. It was his first hat trick in his career.

References

External links

1997 births
Living people
Greek footballers
Greek expatriate footballers
Greece under-21 international footballers
Greece youth international footballers
Super League Greece players
Naoussa F.C. players
Atromitos F.C. players
Getafe CF B players
Segunda División B players
Expatriate footballers in Spain
Greek expatriate sportspeople in Spain
Association football midfielders
Footballers from Veria